The Meadow Lake Petroglyphs (also known as 4-Nev-3) are located in a restricted area by French Lake, California in the Tahoe National Forest.  Attributed to the Martis people, they are listed on the National Register of Historic Places. The prehistoric rock art is significant for the period of 1499 BC to 1000 AD.

References

Petroglyphs in California
Native American history of California
Archaeological sites on the National Register of Historic Places in California
National Register of Historic Places in Nevada County, California
Geography of Nevada County, California